Jump rope is a sport, or its namesake piece of equipment.

Jump rope may also refer to:

 "Jump Rope" (song), a 2009 Blue October song
 "Jump Rope", a song on the album Gone Fishing by The Cool Kids
 "Jump Rope", a song on the album One Man's Trash by Trey Anastasio
 "Jump Rope", a song by Three Loco
 "Jump-Rope", a song on the album Flapjacks from the Sky by Gandalf Murphy and the Slambovian Circus of Dreams

See also 
 Rope jumping (extreme sport), a sporting activity similar to bungee jumping but with a less elastic tether
 Chinese jump rope